The Big Muff Pi (π), often known simply as the Big Muff, is a fuzzbox produced in New York City by the Electro-Harmonix company, along with their Russian sister company Sovtek, primarily for use with the electric guitar. It is used by bassists as well due to the Big Muff's squeaky frequency response.

History
The following is a direct quote from Mike Matthews, Electro-Harmonix founder, and president:

An earlier Electro-Harmonix pedal, the Axis Fuzz, was also manufactured for the Guild guitar company as the Foxey Lady and used a similar chassis as the early Big Muffs, but had a simpler two-transistor circuit. With the introduction of the Big Muff the Axis was discontinued and the Foxey Lady pedal became a rebranded Big Muff. It was available at least until the mid-1970s.

 
The Big Muff Pi was the first overwhelming success for Electro-Harmonix's line of pedals. Due to its reliability, its low price and its distinctive sound, the Big Muff sold consistently through the 1970s and was found in innumerable guitarists' pedal collections. For example, David Gilmour and Carlos Santana were some of first famous users of the pedal. David Gilmour famously used the Big Muff on the Pink Floyd albums Animals and The Wall and most recently on his 2006 On An Island tour. Other artists who used the Big Muff during the 1970s include Thin Lizzy, Kiss, Frank Zappa (though Zappa had it modified to produce a very non-typical Big Muff distortion), and Ronnie Montrose. Even after the Electro-Harmonix company was forced out of business in 1982, the pedal remained in such demand that clones of the Big Muff were made by both competing corporations and independent pedal builders, and demand for "vintage Big Muffs" rose. Unsurprisingly, when Matthews restarted Electro-Harmonix in the 1990s, the Big Muff was one of the first pedals he reintroduced to the market.

The "sustained grind" of the Big Muff was later an integral part of the sound of many alternative rock bands through the 1980s and 1990s, being used extensively by The Smashing Pumpkins, Dinosaur Jr., NOFX, Bush and Mudhoney. The name of the pedal even inspired the title of Mudhoney's 1988 debut EP Superfuzz Bigmuff, as well as Depeche Mode's 1981 instrumental "Big Muff".  Lee Ranaldo and Thurston Moore of Sonic Youth used the Sovtek version of the Big Muff, and, more recently, Dan Auerbach of The Black Keys, who often uses the Sovtek version in a number of The Black Keys songs.
Aside from the Big Muff, Electro-Harmonix has made the Nano Muff, the Metal Muff, which has a 3-band EQ and is a distortion; the Little Big Muff, a smaller variation of the current NYC model, the Deluxe Big Muff, the 77/78 op-amp Big Muff, designed by Howard Davis, which uses IC's to create the Fuzz whereas all others, except the Deluxe Big Muff, use transistors. There also exists a customized limited edition Big Muff, called the Mogwai Big Muff. This pedal was designed for the Scottish band Mogwai, and has a slightly more extreme sound. Electro-Harmonix produced only 100 Mogwai Big Muff pedals. In 2017 Electro-Harmonix reissued the Sovtek Big Muff, commonly known as the 'Green Russian'

Technology
Most versions of the Big Muff use four transistor stages. The first stage is a clean boost, which drives the next two clipping stages which create the distortion. The final stage is a tone recovery stage, which recovers volume loss as the tone stack in the Big Muff is passive and the pedal loses some volume because of this. For a short time in the late-1970s, the Big Muff used op-amps, which at the time were not as highly regarded as the discrete transistor versions. However, the op-amp (or IC) Big Muffs have lately seen a revival among collectors and players alike. The IC (op-amp) Big Muff has a slight variation in sound to the transistor version, it is not as scooped and seems to cut through more in a band situation, which is desirable among some.

Electro-Harmonix also released a large-box version of the Big Muff known as the Deluxe Big Muff Pi. This version included an onboard compressor in addition to the standard Big Muff features. It was available in 2 versions: one with a BLEND switch and another with a SERIES/PARALLEL switch.

Electro-Harmonix themselves have joined the fray with a reissue version of their original Big Muff Pi as well as a smaller "Little Big Muff Pi", that incorporates true-bypass switching, surface-mount components, and a smaller enclosure.

References

External links

 Official Electro-Harmonix website - Big Muff Pi page
 Website about history and development of Big Muff Pi
 Four-part Canadian documentary about the Big Muff
 Very thorough history of Big Muff models

 Effects units